The Song of the Soul is a 1920 silent film drama directed by John W. Noble and starring Vivian Martin. It was produced by Messmore Kendall and Robert W. Chambers. Goldwyn Pictures distributed the film.

The films is preserved in the Cinematheque Royale de Belgique, Brussels.

Cast
Vivian Martin - Barbara Seaforth
Fritz Leiber - Jerry Wendover
Charles E. Graham - Grooze
Ricca Allen - Jinny

References

External links

1920 films
American silent feature films
American black-and-white films
Films directed by John W. Noble
Goldwyn Pictures films
Silent American drama films
1920 drama films
1920s American films